Selection is a 1982 EP by Canadian band 54-40. It was the band's first release, appearing on the independent label Mo-Da-Mu.

Although now out of print, the album and its 1984 follow up Set the Fire were re-released in 1997 on the compilation album, Sound of Truth: The Independent Collection.

Track listing
 "Yank"
 "He's Got"
 "Vows, Sobs, Tears & Kisses"
 "Selection"
 "Re-In-Living"
 "(Jamming With) Lawrence"

54-40 albums
1982 debut EPs